Torretta (Sicilian: Turretta) is a comune in the Metropolitan City of Palermo located on the Mediterranean island of Sicily.

This town is situated on a mountainous area overlooking Palermo.

Olive production is Torretta's primary agriculture product and other industries include aluminum and marble. Monuments include the Santuario della Madonna delle Grazie of XVII. Churches include the Chiesa del Sacramento and the Chiesa and the Monastero del Collegio di Maria.

The town is named Torretta probably due to the presence of a small tower around the latter half of the 17th century. The first inhabited center dates back to 1599 by Baron Arrigo Traina.
Later it came under dominion of Giulio Tommaso Caro, prince of Pelagie (Lampedusa and Linosa). It was later ruled by DiBenedetto family who is renowned for the risings of 1860 for the Unity of Italy.

The population as of 2004 consists of 3,881 people.

References

External links
 http://www.wolframalpha.com/input/?i=torretta%2C+palermo
 https://web.archive.org/web/20080309011404/http://www.comuneditorretta.it/
 http://sicilia.indettaglio.it/eng/comuni/pa/torretta/torretta.html
 https://maps.google.com/maps?source=ig&hl=en&rlz=&q=torretta+palermo

Municipalities of the Metropolitan City of Palermo